Tardeo or Tardeo Road is an elite residential and commercial locality of South Mumbai, from Nana Chowk to Haji Ali Junction. Tardeo is one of Asia’s most expensive residential and commercial locality and house to India’s richest man Mukesh Ambani - Antilia. Tardeo Road is also an important arterial road of the city of Mumbai.

The road is currently known as Javji Dadaji Road from Nana Chowk to Taddeo Circle with post code 400007 and Pandit Madan Mohan Malviya Road from Taddeo Circle to Haji Ali with post code 400034. Post codes 400007 are served by Grant Road post office and 400034 are served by Tulsiwadi post office.

It is connected by railway through the Mumbai Central railway station as well as by buses operated by BEST, MSRTC, and NMMT. Taddeo houses the Regional Transport Office of Mumbai city.

It also has some of Mumbai’s most important commercial offices located in the AC Market Building, Arun Chambers, Commerce House and the Film Centre Building, all on the posh Tardeo Road.

In 1999, Taddeo and the city of Mumbai witnessed the opening of its first full-fledged shopping mall Crossroads, converted from an old pharmaceutical plant belonging to 'Roche'. The mall was an instant success and it attracted loads of people from all corners of the city, however the mall eventually contributed to traffic and pollution in the area. Now Crossroads is known as Brand Factory. Old dilapidated mills and structures are now being demolished by property developers to build residential high rises, similar to other areas of Mumbai.

The Imperial Towers, for a period of time India's tallest, are located in Taddeo .

Taddeo Road also has Mumbai's costliest oval-shaped skyover bridge. It is designed as a cable-stayed bridge, it hangs on a single column placed in the middle of the  skywalk.

Notes

Neighbourhoods in Mumbai